Roberta Jacobson may refer to
Roberta Beach Jacobson, an American journalist and writer
Roberta S. Jacobson, an American diplomat